Thomas Rowbotham may refer to:
 Thomas Leeson Scrase Rowbotham, English watercolourist and oil painter
 Thomas Charles Leeson Rowbotham, his son, Irish watercolour landscape and marine artist and lithographer